Once Upon a Time is the debut studio album by Nigerian singer Tiwa Savage. It was released on July 3, 2013, by Mavin Records and 323 Entertainment. The album was made available for purchase on iTunes a day before its official release. It features guest appearances from Don Jazzy, Flavour N'abania, Leo Wonder, Iceberg Slim, Sarkodie and General Pype. Don Jazzy, Tunji "Tee Billz" Balogun and Tiwa Savage executive produced the album, along with contributions from Warren Oak Felder, Sauce Wilson, Harmony Samuels, GospelOnDeBeatz, Del B, Raydar Ellis and Spellz. The album was supported by seven singles—"Kele Kele Love", "Love Me (3x)", "Without My Heart", "Ife Wa Gbona", "Folarin", "Olorun Mi" and "Eminado". Once Upon a Time was nominated for Best Album of the Year at the 2014 Nigeria Entertainment Awards and for Best R&B/Pop Album at The Headies 2014.

Background and recording
Once Upon a Time was initially scheduled for release in 2011, but problems with clearance made Savage pushed back its release date. The album comprises 21 tracks, including two bonus tracks. Tiwa Savage named the album Once Upon a Time in order to portray the positive stories about her life. She wanted to motivate other upcoming artists by telling them that, once upon a time, she was a little girl in Isale Eko who dreamt of being a star. During an interview with Berklee College of Music's Brenda Pike, she hinted to possibly recording songs with Chuck Harmony, Warren Oak Felder and Sosick. Moreover, she said the album would embody pop, R&B, soul, and yoruba sounds.

On May 26, 2013, Savage revealed the album's cover and track listing during a private album listening party held at the Wheatbaker Hotel in Ikoyi, Lagos. Guests in attendance included Banky W, Waje, Tunde Demuren, and Eku Edewor, among others.

Singles and other releases
The album's lead single "Kele Kele Love" was released on November 4, 2010. The accompanying music video for the song was shot and directed in Los Angeles by Jerry Chan; it was also co-directed by Savage and Tee Billz.

The album's second single "Love Me (3x)" was released on October 10, 2011. The music video for "Love Me (3x)" was shot and directed in Los Angeles by Sesan Ogunro. Savage won Best Vocal Performance (Female) and Best R&B Single for "Love Me (3x)" at The Headies 2012.

The album's third single "Without My Heart" was released on December 5, 2011. It features vocals by Don Jazzy and peaked at number 37 on Afribiz's Top 100 music chart. The song's music video was directed by Mark Hofmeyr. It was nominated for Best African Act Video at the 2013 4Syte TV Music Video Awards. The music video was also nominated for Most Gifted Female Video at the 2013 Channel O Music Video Awards. Furthermore, the song earned Savage and Don Jazzy a nomination at the 2013 Nigeria Entertainment Awards.

The album's fourth single "Ife Wa Gbona" was released on October 8, 2012. It features vocals by Nigerian singer Leo Wonder and peaked at number 66 on Afribiz's Top 100 music chart. The music video for "Ife Wa Gbona" was directed by Bolaji Kekere-Ekun. It won Best Highlife and was nominated for Best Use of Costumes, Best Indigenous Concept and Video of the Year at the 2013 Nigeria Music Video Awards (NMVA).

The Spellz-produced track "Folarin" was released on December 13, 2012, as the album's fifth single. On June 3, 2013, Savage released the album's sixth single "Olorun Mi". Its music video was directed by George Guise. Savage told Ebuka Obi-Uchendu of Channels TV's Rubbin' Minds that the song pays tribute to the Dana Plane Crash, Goldie Harvey and Justice Esiri.

"Eminado" was released as the album's seventh single. In the aforementioned interview with Vanguard newspaper, Savage said she and Don Jazzy came up with the song's idea while rehearsing in the studio. The Clarence Peters-directed music video for "Eminado" was released on November 4, 2013.

Savage dedicated the song "Written All Over Your Face" to her fiance for the role he played in her life. "Written All Over Your Face" was criticized for having lewd and explicit lyrics. The Moe Musa-directed music video for "Wanted" was released on May 27, 2014. The video's release triggered an angry backlash among critics.

Critical reception

Once Upon a Time was met with generally positive reviews from music critics. Ayomide Tayo of Nigerian Entertainment Today awarded the album 4 stars out of 5, praising Savage's songwriting skills and commending the production team for bringing "depth and range to the album's production." Ronke Adepoju of TayoTV assigned a score of 8.75/10, applauding Savage for "showing her versatility by working with different artistes from different genres". Adepoju also opined that Savage "managed to pull it off with the minimum help possible." Hip Hop World Magazine granted the album 4 stars out of 5, acknowledging Savage for "producing an album that accommodates her songwriting skill and pop ambitions."

In a less enthusiastic review, Ogaga Sakpaide of TooXclusive gave the album 2.5 stars out of 5, adding, "Despite the involvement of different production "heavyweights" on the album, the total body of work lacks an actual identity." Sakpaide also stated that the record is "lacking the organic sound an album should possess." Wilfred Okiche of YNaija extensively said, "At 21 songs, there are just too many fillers, too much autotune, too much Don Jazzy and an over dependence on the gloss. One has to dig deep to find the real substance. It plays like Ms Savage is just pandering, surrendering to market dictates while throwing a bit of her true self in between."

Accolades

Track listing

Samples
"Wanted" samples a line from Damian Marley's "Welcome to Jamrock". It also contains a sample of Ini Kamoze's "World a Music".   
"Fela Interlude" samples Fela Kuti's "Lady".
"Without My Heart" samples the instrumental of Lumidee's "Never Leave You (Uh Oooh, Uh Oooh)".

Personnel

Tiwatope Savage – primary artist, writer
Michael Collins Ajereh – executive producer, record producer, featured artist
Tunji "Tee Billz" Balogun – executive producer, writer
Warren ‘Oak’ Felder – record producer
Sauce Wilson – record producer
Harmony Samuels – record producer
Gospel On D Beatz – record producer
Del B – record producer
Raydar Ellis – record producer
Spellz Magik Boi – record producer
Sossick – record producer
Chinedu Okoli – featured artist, writer
Leo Wonder – featured artist, writer
Olusegun Olowokere – featured artist, writer
Michael Owusu Addo – featured artist, writer
General Pype – featured artist, writer
Oluwatobi Wande Ojosipe – writer
Richard King – writer
Chigul – writer
Altims – writer
Trafik – writer
Marcus McCauley – writing credits
Rahima Balogun – writing credits
Zakira Ousley – writing credits

Release history

References

External links

2013 debut albums
Tiwa Savage albums
Albums produced by Don Jazzy
Albums produced by Harmony Samuels
Yoruba-language albums
Albums produced by Del B
Albums produced by Spellz
Albums produced by GospelOnDeBeatz
Albums produced by Oak Felder